Jennifer Morgan (born March 13, 1971) is an American technology executive. She is the former Co-Chief Executive Officer at SAP SE. Morgan became the first American woman ever appointed to the SAP Executive Board in 2017. Morgan is the first female Chief Executive of SAP, and she is the first female CEO of a company on the DAX index.

Early life and education 
Morgan was born and raised in Northern Virginia, just outside of Washington, DC. She studied at James Madison University. Following her graduation, Morgan began to work at Andersen Consulting (now Accenture) where she met her husband, Michael.

Career 
Following her employment at Andersen Consulting, Morgan served in a business development role at Siebel Systems from 2000 to 2004. Morgan joined SAP in 2004 as part of the company's public sector business. From there, Morgan rose quickly within SAP leadership. In just five years, Morgan went from President of SAP Regulated Industries to the President of the Americas & Asia Pacific Japan. In 2017, Morgan was appointed to the SAP executive board and in April 2019 she became President of the SAP Cloud Business Group.  In October 2019, Morgan and fellow SAP Executive Board member Christian Klein were named Co-Chief Executive Officers of SAP following the departure of CEO Bill McDermott.

Beginning in 2015, while she was President of SAP North America, Morgan led efforts to close the gender pay gap at SAP. After independent audits of Morgan's initiative, SAP raised salaries by over $1 million across the company, which resulted in 99% of all men and women being paid equally.

In January 2019, Morgan launched her podcast, A Call to Lead. The podcast targets mid-career professionals and discusses leadership and career advancement. Morgan's podcast guests have included academics, business professionals, and government officials (including First Lady Jill Biden, Simon Sinek, and others).

On April 30, 2020, Morgan stepped down from her position as co-CEO citing a mutual decision with the company board.

In November 2020, Blackstone Group announced that Morgan joined the firm as its first Global Head of Portfolio Transformation and Talent.

Recognition 
In 2019, Fortune Magazine named Morgan ranked 43rd on Fortune Magazine's list of the 50 Most Powerful Women in Business.

In 2019, Morgan was ranked 49th on Forbes' list of Most Powerful Women in the World. Morgan was ranked 55th on Forbes’ list of Most Powerful Women in the World for 2018.

In 2017, the New York Hall of Science honored Morgan with the Distinguished Leadership Award.

References

External links 
Jennifer Morgan / Co-Chief Executive Officer (Co-CEO) SAP SE

SAP SE people
1971 births
Living people
American technology chief executives
American women chief executives
Businesspeople from Virginia
James Madison University alumni
People from Fairfax, Virginia
21st-century American businesspeople
21st-century American businesswomen